Petulia is a 1968 British-American drama film directed by Richard Lester and starring Julie Christie, George C. Scott and Richard Chamberlain. The film has a screenplay by Lawrence B. Marcus from a story by Barbara Turner and is based on the 1966 novel Me and the Arch Kook Petulia by John Haase. It was scored by John Barry.

Plot
Petulia Danner is a young socialite married to a savagely abusive architect. At a benefit concert for victims of traffic accidents, she meets Dr. Archie Bollen, with whom she becomes smitten because he treated an injured Mexican boy. Archie is in the process of divorcing his wife Polo, sifting through relationships with the new man in his ex's life, his estranged sons, and well-to-do friends who only know Archie as one-half of a couple. Petulia and Archie embark on a quirky, desperate, and ultimately tragic affair.

Cast

 Julie Christie as Petulia Danner
 George C. Scott as Dr. Archie Bollen
 Richard Chamberlain as David Danner
 Arthur Hill as Barney
 Shirley Knight as Prudence "Polo" Bollen
 Joseph Cotten as Mr. Danner
 Pippa Scott as May
 Kathleen Widdoes as Wilma
 Roger Bowen as Warren
 Richard Dysart as Motel Receptionist
 Ruth Kobart as Nun
 Ellen Geer as Nun
 Lou Gilbert as Mr. Howard
 Nate Esformes as Mr. Mendoza
 Maria Val as Mrs. Mendoza
 Vincent Arias as Oliver
 Eric Weiss as Michael
 Kevin Cooper as Stevie
 Rene Auberjonois as Fred Six (uncredited)
 Peter Bonerz (uncredited)
 Barbara Bosson (uncredited)
 Barbara Colby as Patient (uncredited)
 Garry Goodrow (uncredited)
 Carl Gottlieb (uncredited)
 Howard Hesseman as Hippie (uncredited)
 Kathryn Ish (uncredited)
 Austin Pendleton as Intern (uncredited)
 Richard Stahl (uncredited)
 Mel Stewart (uncredited)

Production
Producer Raymond Wagner originally developed the film with director Robert Altman, who brought on screenwriter Barbara Turner to adapt John Haase's novel. Turner's version was largely faithful to the novel—a romantic story told, as Kirkus Reviews put it, with "a light, trenchant wit." However, Altman and Wagner then dissolved their partnership, and Wagner engaged Richard Lester as the new director of Petulia. As Lester's biographer Andrew Yule wrote, "Lester hated both the book and the script, especially the cuteness of its leading character. But there was something about it, perhaps the challenge of bringing its archness down to earth and injecting a healthy dose of reality." Lester brought on his frequent collaborator, screenwriter Charles Wood, for a page-one rewrite, then replaced Wood with Lawrence B. Marcus. As Lester told the San Francisco Examiner, "I don't see it as a comedy. Larry Marcus' screenplay has altered the novel considerably -- to a sad love story about two people who meet and turn each other into opposites."

Petulia was filmed on location throughout San Francisco during the summer of 1967. In addition to stars George C. Scott, Julie Christie, Richard Chamberlain, Shirley Knight, and Joseph Cotten, Lester included San Francisco musicians like Janis Joplin (who performs in the opening scene), The Grateful Dead, and members of the comedy troupes The Committee and Ace Trucking Company. The film included scenes at the apartment building located at 307 Filbert Street, the Cala Foods on Hyde, and the Fairmont Hotel.

This was Nicolas Roeg's last job as cinematographer before becoming a director himself. Critic Jonathan Rosenbaum points out that it was on Petulia "that Roeg can be said to have arrived at many of the rudiments of style and structure that characterize his own, subsequent films, the first of which was Performance. An essential part of this manner is a form of rapid and fragmented, kaleidoscopic cross-cutting between diverse strands in a narrative tapestry, an approach that creates meaning largely through unexpected juxtapositions. By and large,  it is a wide-ranging, impressionistic method which can make a relatively simple plot multilayered and complex, and an already difficult plot a series of puzzles and mazes."

Reception
Petulia had been listed to compete at the 1968 Cannes Film Festival, but the festival was cancelled due to the May 1968 protests and unrest in France.

John Haase, the author of the source novel, loathed the movie, and wrote a scathing article for the Los Angeles Times about the book's journey to the screen, concluding, "The novel is gone. Barbara Turner's screenplay is gone. Altman is gone, Petulia is gone, Archie is gone. Only Ray Wagner is left, and Dick Lester and 350,000 feet of film, and miniskirts, and the Jefferson Airplane, and the Grateful Dead, and the topless restaurants, and the hippies, and the junkies and the go-go girls and the mod and the pop and the op and all the other sick and ugly things of our time the book never dealt with at all. That's what's left."

But Lester himself was pleased with the film. As he told Steven Soderbergh years later, "I felt that I had plugged into what I wanted to say, and that a chance had been given me by odd circumstances: taking a book that seemed totally wrong and being angry about it, then trying to see what one could make of it and using that as a means of talking about fairly complicated things ... a frazzled and disjointed response to a society that was in chaos and they didn't know how to deal with it."

The film was a box office disappointment upon its release in 1968. As Tobias Churton wrote in his book The Spiritual Meaning of the Sixties, "Petulia failed to strike a chord with the public. Its approach was too advanced, ambiguous, perhaps even too prophetic."

Critical reviews were initially mixed on the film. Giving the film four stars, Roger Ebert wrote in his Chicago Sun-Times review of 1 July 1968: "Richard Lester's Petulia made me desperately unhappy, and yet I am unable to find a single thing wrong with it." In The New York Times, Renata Adler called it "a strange, lovely, nervous little film." On the other side of the ledger, in her 1969 essay "Trash, Art, and the Movies," Pauline Kael wrote that "I have rarely seen a more disagreeable, a more dislikable (or a bloodier) movie than Petulia." Critic John Simon went even further, calling the film "a soulless, arbitrary, attitudinizing piece of claptrap."

In time, however, Petulia developed a passionate cult following, and many critics and writers came to see it as a key film of its era. Danny Peary devoted a chapter to the film in his 1981 book Cult Movies, describing it as "one of the best American films of the last fifteen years. Petulia is a brilliant film, inspiringly cast and beautifully acted, so rich in character and visual and aural detail that it takes several viewings to absorb it all. Lester makes the viewer work to grasp the meaning of his film." In How to Read a Film, James Monaco called Petulia "as prescient as it was sharply ironic – one of the two or three best American films of the period." Joel Siegel asserted that "Petulia is, without question, my favorite American movie, perhaps my favorite of all movies. I’ve seen it at least twice a year since it was released and each viewing has yielded fresh insights and pleasures."

Mark Bourne wrote in DVD Journal that "in 1978 a Take One magazine poll of 20 film critics — including Vincent Canby, Richard Corliss, Stanley Kauffmann, Janet Maslin, Frank Rich, Andrew Sarris, Richard Schickel, David Thomson and François Truffaut — ranked Petulia among the best American films of the previous decade, taking third place after The Godfather (I and II) and Nashville, and ahead of Annie Hall, Mean Streets and 2001."

Awards and nominations

Music
Lester uses the current West Coast musicians of the time: Janis Joplin with Big Brother and the Holding Company, the Grateful Dead playing "Viola Lee Blues", The Committee, and Ace Trucking Company are briefly featured in club sequences. Grateful Dead members Jerry Garcia, Mickey Hart, Bob Weir, Phil Lesh, Ron "Pigpen" McKernan, and Bill Kreutzmann appear in cameos during the movie's apartment house medical emergency scene as onlookers. Jerry Garcia also appears in duplicate on a large mural and in triplicate on a bus bench both times in stylized solid black and white.

Petulia was an influence on filmmaker Steven Soderbergh.

The track "All Things To All Men" by The Cinematic Orchestra begins with a sample of John Barry's haunting saxophone theme from the film.

Home media
The film was released on VHS. A US DVD was released in 2006.

References

External links
 
 

1968 films
1968 romantic drama films
Adultery in films
American nonlinear narrative films
American romantic drama films
British romantic drama films
Films about couples
Films based on American novels
Films directed by Richard Lester
Films about domestic violence
Films set in San Francisco
Films shot in San Francisco
Films scored by John Barry (composer)
Warner Bros. films
1960s English-language films
1960s American films
1960s British films